Tsidi Ibrahim (born November 26, 1976), known professionally as Jean Grae (formerly What? What?), is an American rapper. She rose in the underground hip hop scene in New York City and has built an international fanbase. Grae's unique music and lyrical style have earned the artist recognition as a favorite emcee by many rap artists such as Talib Kweli, Jay-Z, and Black Thought of the Roots.

Early life
Jean Grae was born Tsidi Ibrahim, in Cape Town, South Africa on November 26, 1976. The child of South African jazz musicians Sathima Bea Benjamin and Abdullah Ibrahim, Jean was raised in New York City, where the family moved after Jean's birth. Grae studied Vocal Performance at Fiorello H. LaGuardia High School, before studying a Major in Music Business at New York University; dropping out after three weeks of class.

Musical career

1996–1998: Career beginnings
In 1995, Jean was discovered by George Rithm Martinez when he recruited the artist for a five-song demo in his group Ground Zero. The demo earned "Unsigned Hype" honors in The Source in March 1996. Jean later joined a hip hop group called Natural Resource along with rapper Ocean and disc jockey James "AGGIE" Barrett. In 1996, they released two 12-inch singles on their label, Makin' Records. They appeared on singles by Pumpkinhead and Bad Seed, as well as on the O.B.S. (Original Blunted Soldiers) double 12-inch single. They produced much of the material released under pseudonym "Run Run Shaw".

1998–2004: Solo career
Natural Resource dissolved in 1998, after which Jean changed her stage name from What? What? to Jean Grae, a reference to the X-Men character Jean Grey. Jean released the LP, Attack of the Attacking Things, on August 6, 2002, and released This Week on September 21, 2004. Jean has recorded with major hip-hop artists such as Atmosphere, The Roots, Phonte, Mr. Len, Pharoahe Monch, and The Herbaliser.

Grae recorded an album with North Carolina producer 9th Wonder, entitled Jeanius; the unfinished recording was leaked online, and work stopped. However, at a release party for 9th Wonder's Dream Merchant Volume 2, Jean stated that Jeanius was still going to be released. It was released on June 24, 2008 on Zune Live Marketplace, then on disc on July 8, 2008. Jean's rapping was described by Robert Christgau as "remarkable for its rapidity, clarity and idiomatic cadence. The writing has a good-humored polysyllabic literacy."

2005–2008: Blacksmith Music
Previously signed to Babygrande Records, Jean signed a deal in 2005 with Talib Kweli's Blacksmith Records. On April 28, 2008, Grae posted a blog entry on MySpace saying goodbye to fans. Jean was disenchanted with the music industry and desired to start a family, but said that work on new material was ongoing. In July 2008, Talib Kweli posted a blog entry explaining Grae's album, mentioning that Grae was not retiring. He encouraged fans to purchase the album, referring to Grae as "one of the last true MCs left." Grae returned to doing live performances later that year.

2008–present: Freelance
On September 18, 2008, Grae posted a Craigslist ad offering creative services for $800/16 bars. On a blog, Jean stated, "I don't wanna complain anymore, I just wanna change some things about the way artists are treated and the way you guys are allowed to be involved, since it IS the digital age." Since then, Jean's music has been self-released through the artist's website and Bandcamp.

On June 25, 2011, Grae released a free mixtape entitled Cookies or Comas, which features guest appearances from Styles P, Talib Kweli and Pharoahe Monch; it also includes "Assassins" from Monch's W.A.R. album and "Uh Oh" From Talib Kweli's Gutter Rainbows. This was followed by the 10-track Dust Ruffle on January 2, 2013, featuring unreleased songs from 2004 to 2010. Between October and November 2013, Grae released EPs titled Gotham Down Cycle 1: Love in Infinity (Lo-Fi), Gotham Down Cycle II: Leviathan, Gotham Down Cycle 3: The Artemis Epoch. In December 2013, Jean combined them into Gotham Down Deluxe.

Grae branched out from music, releasing audiobook The State of Eh in January 2014, and writing, directing and starring in the online sitcom Life with Jeanie. In 2013, Jean had a supporting role in indie film Big Words and in 2015 appeared on the And The Crime Ring episode of CBS sitcom 2 Broke Girls. On October 2, 2016, Jean hosted the Golden Probes. On September 9, 2018, Grae and Quelle Chris released their 15 track joint album Everything's Fine, rated by Rolling Stone as the 22nd best Hip Hop Album of 2018.

Personal life and musical style 
On December 3, 2017, Grae got engaged to fellow rapper and producer Quelle Chris. On August 5, 2018, they were married at the W Loft in Brooklyn. He is known for more than 15 studio albums and collaborative albums with fellow rappers.

Grae is non-binary,
and uses she/her pronouns.

Grae's rapping style relies on a complex interplay of shifting rhythms and slanted rhymes. An analysis by Matt Daniels for The Pudding indicated that Jean uses a higher-than-average range of vocabulary in her lyrics.

Discography

Studio albums 
Attack of the Attacking Things (2002)
This Week (2004)
Jeanius (with 9th Wonder) (2008)
Everything's Fine (with Quelle Chris) (2018)

Compilation albums
Dust Ruffle (2012)
Gotham Down Deluxe (2013)

EPs
The Bootleg of the Bootleg EP (2003)
Ho x 3: A Christmas Thingy (2012)
Gotham Down: Cycle 1: Love In Infinity (Lo-Fi) (2013)
Gotham Down: Cycle II: Leviathan (2013)
Gotham Down: Cycle 3: The Artemis Epoch (2013)
jeannie. (2014)
#5 (2014)
The State of Eh. A Read Along Album Book Thing. By Jean Grae. (2014)
That's Not How You Do That: An Instructional Album for Adults (2014)
That's Not How You Do That Either: Yet Another Instructional Album for Adults (2015)
iSweatergawd (2015)
Saix (2015)
Jean Grae's CHRISTMAKWHANNUVUSWALIYEARS (2015)
MERRYPOCALYPSE (with Quelle Chris) (2016)
Sevvin (2016)

Mixtapes
The Official Bootleg (2003)
The Grae Files (2004)
The Grae Mixtape (2004)
Hurricane Jean The Mixtape (2005)
Hurricane Jean: The Jeanius Strikes Again (2005)
Cookies or Comas (2011)

Other song appearances

 Immortal Technique – The Illest (ft. Jean Grae and Pumpkinhead)
 Immortal Technique – You Never Know (ft. Jean Grae)
 Akir – Tropical Fantasy (ft. Jean Grae)
 The High & Mighty – Hands On Experience (ft. What?What?, Kool Keith and Bobbito)
 Tek 9 – Keep It Hot (ft. What?What?)
 Tek 9 – Bruklon (ft. What?What?)
 Mr. Lif – Post Mortem
 Atmosphere – Insomnia 411 (ft. Roosevelt Franklin and Jean Grae)
 The Herbaliser – Blow Your Headphones – "The Blend"
 The Herbaliser – Blow Your Headphones – "New + Improved"
 The Herbaliser – Blow Your Headphones – Bring It"
 The Herbaliser – Very Mercenary – "Mission Improbable"
 The Herbaliser – Very Mercenary – "Let It Go"
 The Herbaliser – Take London – "Nah' Mean, Nah'm Sayin'"
 The Herbaliser – Take London – "Generals"
 The Herbaliser – Take London – "Close Your Eyes"
 The Herbaliser – Take London – "Twice Around"
 The Herbaliser – Take London (second edition's bonus disc) – "More Tea, More Beer"
 The Herbaliser – Take London (second edition's bonus disc) – "How To Keep A Girlfriend"
 The Herbaliser – Same As It Never Was – "Street Karma (A Cautionary Tale)"
 Masta Ace – Disposable Arts – "Hold U" (ft. Jean Grae)
 Masta Ace – Soda and Soap (ft. Jean Grae)
 Quelle Chris – Being You Is Great, I Wish I Could Be You More Often – "The Prestige" (ft. Jean Grae)
 Talib Kweli – New York Shit (ft. Jean Grae)
 Talib Kweli – Say Something
 Talib Kweli – Where You Gonna Run (ft. Jean Grae)
 Talib Kweli – Uh Oh (ft. Jean Grae)
 Talib Kweli – Black Girl Pain (ft. Jean Grae)
 Cannibal Ox – Swing Blades (ft. Jean Grae)
 Soul Daddy – No Drank (ft. Jean Grae)
 Ski Beatz – Prowler 2 (ft. Jean Grae, Jay Electronica, Joell Ortiz & Mos Def)
 Wale – Goodbye (ft. Jean Grae)
 Diverse – Under the hammer (ft. Jean Grae)
 Joell Ortiz – So Wrong (ft. Talib Kweli, Brother Ali & Jean Grae)
 Lil B – Base 4 Ya Face (ft. Jean Grae & Phonte)
 DJ Jazzy Jeff – Supa Jean (ft. Jean Grae)
 Pharoahe Monch – Assassins (ft. Jean Grae & Royce Da 5'9")
 Sharkey – Sharkey's Machine – "Summer in the City (Lovin' It)"
 Rosco P. Coldchain – It's Our World (Tryin' Times) (ft. D.P. & Jean Grae)
 Maurice "Mobetta" Brown – Back At The Ranch (ft. Jean Grae)
 Bodi – Epilogue (ft. Kristoff Krane & Jean Grae)
 Jota Mayúscula – Maybe (ft. Jean Grae)
 The Roots – Somebody's Gotta Do It (ft. Jean Grae)
 MC Frontalot - Gold Locks
 Rapsody - Blankin Out Remix (ft. Jean Grae)
 Sammus - 1080p (feat. Jean Grae)"
 Flying Pupa - Can It''

References

External links 
Jean Grae Discography on Discogs
Jean Grae Lyrics

1976 births
Living people
American people of South African descent
Underground rappers
Rappers from Brooklyn
East Coast hip hop musicians
Songwriters from New York (state)
American hip hop record producers
South African songwriters
Fiorello H. LaGuardia High School alumni
South African record producers
Record producers from New York (state)
21st-century American rappers
African-American songwriters
21st-century African-American musicians
20th-century African-American people
Crooklyn Dodgers members
Non-binary musicians
21st-century African-American people
African-American rappers
Hip hop record producers
American record producers
21st-century American musicians
American rappers